Inner Mongolia Normal University is a university in Inner Mongolia, People's Republic of China under the authority of the Autonomous Region government. It is located in Hohhot, the capital city of Inner Mongolia Autonomous Region.

Established in 1952, it is the first university established in Inner Mongolia after the foundation of the People's Republic of China in 1949. It was later made a "key university" in Inner Mongolia.

Affiliated Middle School

The Affiliated Middle School to Inner Mongolia Normal University, abbreviated as Fuzhong, is a public secondary school serving senior high school levels, located in Hohhot, Inner Mongolia, China.

Founded in 1954, the Affiliated Middle School to Inner Mongolia Normal University is a public high school which blends Chinese and Mongolian cultures. It is a key provincial high school in Inner Mongolia and is one of the top high schools incorporating historical and cultural aspects of the region.

The school presently has three key programs with teaching incorporating three languages, Chinese, Mongolian and English.

The school campus is in the southern part of urban area and surrounded by many universities such as Inner Mongolia University, Inner Mongolia Normal University and Inner Mongolia Agricultural University. The main campus is in No.10, Daxue West Street, Saihan District, Hohhot.

The contact number of school is 0471-6293680.

See also
Hohhot
Hohhot No.2 Middle School

References

External links
  Inner Mongolia Normal University website
  Inner Mongolia Normal University website

 
Teachers colleges in China
Universities and colleges in Inner Mongolia
Education in Hohhot